The following is a list of deathcore artists. Deathcore is an extreme metal fusion genre that combines the characteristics of death metal and metalcore and sometimes hardcore punk. It is defined by death metal riffs, blast beats and use of metalcore breakdowns. Deathcore gained most prominence within the southwestern United States, especially Arizona and inland southern California (mostly the Coachella Valley), which are home to many notable bands and various festivals.

Artists

A
 Abated Mass of Flesh
 The Acacia Strain
 After the Burial
 The Agonist
 The Agony Scene
 All Shall Perish
 Animosity
 Antagony
 Arsonists Get All the Girls
 As Blood Runs Black
 Attila
 The Autumn Offering

B
 Beneath the Massacre
 Betraying the Martyrs
 Bhayanak Maut
 The Black Dahlia Murder
 Bleed from Within
 Born of Osiris
 Bring Me the Horizon

C
 Carnifex
 Chelsea Grin
 The Concubine
 The Contortionist
 The Crimson Armada
 Cryptopsy

D
 Dance Club Massacre
 Dir En Grey
 Despised Icon
 A Different Breed of Killer
 Distinguisher

E
 Elysia
 Emmure
 Eternal Lord
 Extortionist

F
 Fit for an Autopsy
 Frontside

G
 Glass Casket
 God Forbid

H
 Heaven Shall Burn

I
 I Declare War
 Impending Doom
 Infant Annihilator
 In the Midst of Lions

J
 Job for a Cowboy

K
 Knights of the Abyss

L
 Lorna Shore

M
 Make Them Suffer
 Malefice
 Maroon
 Mendeed
 Molotov Solution
 Mortal Treason
 Mud Factory

N
 Nights Like These

O
 Oceano

R
 The Red Chord
 The Red Death
 The Red Shore
 Rings of Saturn

S
 Salt the Wound
 See You Next Tuesday
 Shadow of Intent
 Signs of the Swarm 
 Suicide Silence
 Slaughter to Prevail

T
 Through the Eyes of the Dead 
 Thy Art Is Murder
 The Browning

U
 Upon a Burning Body

V
 Veil of Maya

W
 We Butter the Bread with Butter
 Whitechapel
 Winds of Plague
 Within the Ruins
 With Blood Comes Cleansing

See also 
 List of death metal bands
 List of metalcore bands
 List of hardcore punk bands

References

Deathcore
Lists of metalcore bands
Deathcore musical groups
Lists of death metal bands